This is a list of the Honduras national football team results from 1980 to 1989.

1980
In 1980, Honduras played against El Salvador for the first time since the Football War in 1969.

1981

1982
The year 1982 marks the first time Honduras participated in a FIFA World Cup.  It also was the year they faced an Asian team for the first time when they defeated the United Arab Emirates with a 0–1 score.

1983

1984

1985

1986

1987

1988

Record
Record does not include matches against clubs or amateur teams.

References

1980s